Corycus (also transliterated Corycos or Korykos; ; , lit. "maiden castle") was an ancient city in Cilicia Trachaea, Anatolia, located at the mouth of the valley called Şeytan deresi; the site is now occupied by the town of Kızkalesi (formerly Ghorgos), Mersin Province, Turkey.

The city
Strabo does not mention a town of Corycus, but reports a promontory so called at the location, but a town Corycus is mentioned by Livy (xxxiii. 20), and by Pliny (v. 27), and Pomponius Mela (i. 13), and Stephanus of Byzantium (s. v. Κώρυκος). In antiquity, Corycus was an important harbor and commercial town. It was the port of Seleucia, where, in 191 BCE, the fleet of Antiochus the Great was defeated by the Romans. In the Roman times it preserved its ancient laws; the emperors usually kept a fleet there to watch over the pirates. Corycus was also a mint in antiquity and some of its coins survive.

Corycus was controlled by the Byzantine Empire. Justinian I restored the public baths and a hospital. The admiral Eustathios Kymineianos re-fortified the island on the orders of Alexios I Komnenos at the beginning of the 12th century, adding a supplementary castle on a small island. This castle was later called "maidens castle", because it was told that a king held his daughter here in captivity until she was killed by a venomous snake. It was prophesied she would die by a snake bite. So she was taken to the sea castle to protect her, but a serpent was taken by basket to the castle, she was bitten and died. Corycus was conquered by the Armenians soon after it was rebuilt by the Byzantines.

Until the mid-14th century the Armenians held both the mainland and island castles, which guarded this strategic port for the Armenian Kingdom of Cilicia. Simon, the Baron of Koŕikos, attended the coronation of King Levon I in 1198/99. Subsequent Armenian nobles maintained authority in the area (with a few brief interruptions) until 1360, when Peter I, the King of Cyprus, removed the Mamelukes and assumed suzerainty. In the late 14th century it fell again to the Turks. From 1448 or 1454 it belonged alternately to the Karamanids, the Egyptians, the Karamanids a second time, and finally to the Ottoman Empire.

Archaeological surveys published in 1982 and 1987 found that the Armenians maintained (with occasional repairs) the mainland castle’s simple Byzantine plan with its rectangular double walls, square towers, and two chapels, all of which were built with masonry taken from the nearby late antique city. The only original Armenian construction is one small chapel. Kizkalesi on the island has the extensive remains of Armenian rebuilding. The island was once connected to the mainland fort by a breakwater.

The ruins of the city are extensive. Among them are a triumphal arch, a necropolis with a beautiful Christian tomb, sarcophagi, etc. The two medieval castles, one on the shore, the other in an islet, connected by a ruined pier, are partially preserved; the former was reputed impregnable. The walls of the castle on the mainland contain many pieces of columns; and a mole of great unhewn rocks projects from one angle of the fortress about a hundred yards across the bay. Three churches are also found, one decorated with frescoes. The walls of the ancient city may still be traced, and there appear to be sufficient remains to invite a careful examination of the spot.

Bishopric
The city figures in the Synecdemus of Hierocles, and in a Notitia Episcopatuum of about 840. The bishopric of Corycus was a suffragan of Tarsus, the capital of the Roman province of Cilicia Prima, to which Corycus belonged. Of the bishops of the see, Germanus was at the First Council of Constantinople in 381; Sallustius took part in the Council of Ephesus in 431 and a synod held in Tarsus in 434, and was represented at the Council of Chalcedon by his metropolitan bishop Theodorus, who signed the acts of the council on his behalf; Archelaus went to a synod called by Patriarch Menas of Constantinople in 536; Cyprianus was at the Second Council of Constantinople in 553; and Ioannes participated in the Third Council of Constantinople in 680 and the Trullan Council in 692. In the aftermath of the Fourth Crusade, Corycus became the seat of Latin Church bishops, one of whom, named Gerardus, took part in a council at Antioch in 1136. No longer a residential bishopric, Corycus is today listed by the Catholic Church as a titular see.

Two Armenian inscriptions that were discovered at the castles of Korykos were credited to its construction to Levon I and then to Hetum I.

Corycian Cave
In the Corycian Cave (now Cennet ve Cehennem), 20 stadia inland, says Strabo, the best crocus (saffron) grows. He describes this cave as a great hollow, of a circular form, surrounded by a margin of rock, on all sides of a considerable height; on descending into this cavity, the ground is found to be uneven and generally rocky, and it is filled with shrubs, both evergreen and cultivated; in some parts the saffron is cultivated: there is also a cave here which contains a large source, which pours forth a river of pure, pellucid water, but it immediately sinks into the earth, and flowing underground enters the sea: they call it the Bitter Water. Pomponius Mela (i.13) has a long description of the same place apparently from the same authority that Strabo followed, but more embellished. This place is probably on the top of the mountain above Corycus.

This place is famed in Greek mythology. It is the Cilician cave of Pindar (Pythian Ode i. 31), and of Aeschylus (Prom. Vinct. 350), and it is the lair of Zeus' fiercest opponent, the monster Typhon or Typhoeus.

See also
 Kızkalesi, Mersin (current settlement)

Gallery

References

 Smith, William (editor); Dictionary of Greek and Roman Geography, "Corycus", London, (1854)
 Blue Guide, Turkey, The Aegean and Mediterranean Coasts, pp. 550–51.

External links
 Kizkalesi photo gallery
 Corycus Castle photo gallery
 Corycus Church Ruins photos
 Carefully documented photographic survey and plans of Corycus Land and Sea Castles 
 Corycus drone view and aerial shots
 About Corycus castle
 

Armenian castles
Populated places of the Byzantine Empire
Cilicia (Roman province)
Ancient Greek archaeological sites in Turkey
Roman towns and cities in Turkey
Coloniae (Roman)
Catholic titular sees in Asia
Former populated places in Turkey
World Heritage Tentative List for Turkey
Archaeological sites in Mersin Province, Turkey
Populated places in ancient Cilicia